Hypselodoris insulana is a species of sea slug or dorid nudibranch, a marine gastropod mollusk in the family Chromodorididae.

Distribution
This nudibranch is found in the Northwestern Hawaiian Islands of Midway and Kure Atoll in the central Pacific Ocean.

Description
Hypselodoris insulana has an off-white or brown coloured body and a bright purple mantle edge and foot. There are white longitudinal lines on its dorsum. The gills and rhinophores are white, lined with orange bands. This species can reach a total length of at least .

References

Chromodorididae
Gastropods described in 1999